Amidabad-e Qazi (also Romanized as ʿAmīdābād-e Qāz̤ī) is a village in Darmian Rural District, in the Central District of Darmian County, South Khorasan Province, Iran. At the 2006 census, its population was 16, in 5 families.

References 

Populated places in Darmian County